Allen Christopher Bertram Bathurst, 9th Earl Bathurst (born 11 March 1961), known as Lord Apsley until 2011, is a British peer, landowner, and conservationist.

Life
The son of Henry Bathurst, 8th Earl Bathurst, and his wife Judith Mary Nelson, he was styled as Lord Apsley from birth.

By 1999 he was living at Cirencester House in Gloucestershire. From there he administers the Bathurst estate of some 15,500 acres in Gloucestershire and Wiltshire. It includes much of the villages of Sapperton and Coates, Pinbury Park, and the principal source of the River Thames. Within the estate is the Ivy Lodge polo ground, home of Cirencester Park Polo Club. Bathurst is also farmer of the Cirencester Park Farms.

On 16 October 2011, he succeeded his father as Earl Bathurst (1772), Baron Bathurst of Battlesden (1712), and Lord Apsley (1771), all in the peerage of Great Britain. 

In 2018 he was living with his wife Sarah at Cirencester House, the family seat. 

Bathurst is active in the National Farmers Union and is the founding Director of the annual Cotswold Country Show, held every July on his estate. He is a past governor of the Royal Agricultural University, a director of the Gloucestershire Farming Trust, and a past President of the Three Counties Agricultural Society.

Bathurst is President of the Gloucestershire Farming and Wildlife Advisory Group, Cirencester Housing, Cirencester Park Polo Club, and the Cirencester Hospital League of Friends, the Cirencester Band, and the Cirencester Male Voice Choir. He is Marshal of the St Lawrence Hospital Trust. He is Patron of the Cotswolds Museum Trust; Steward of the Cirencester Society in London; and Patron of the Cirencester Cricket Club.

Personal life
In 1986, as Lord Apsley, he married firstly Hilary Jane George, daughter of John F. George; they were divorced in 1994, having had two children:
Benjamin George Henry Bathurst, Lord Apsley (born 1990)
Hon. Rosie Meriel Lilias Bathurst (born 1992)

On 5 June 1995, at Cirencester, he married secondly Sarah L. Chapman, daughter of Christopher and Marguerite Chapman of Ilminster, Somerset.

In February 1993, he was convicted of drink-driving.

When Gloucestershire County Council planned to demolish a historic building in the cattle market at Cirencester, built by the 6th Earl Bathurst, to make way for a Leisure Centre, Lord and Lady Apsley made headline news when they threatened to chain themselves to the building to prevent the demolition. Bathurst later negotiated to buy the building and had it removed, brick by brick, and rebuilt on his own land.

References

External links
Bathurst, Earl (GB, 1772), Cracroft's Peerage

9
1961 births
Living people
British conservationists
People associated with the Royal Agricultural University
Allen
Alumni of Wye College